Sukoró is a village in Fejér county, Hungary.

History
Sukoró was originally referred to as Sokoró in documents in 1270. In preparation for the Battle of Pákozd, Lajos Kossuth held a war council meeting in a Calvinist Church in Sukoró on September 28.

References

External links 

 Street map 

Populated places in Fejér County